{{DISPLAYTITLE:C10H12}}
The molecular formula C10H12 (molar mass: 132.20 g/mol, exact mass: 132.0939 u) may refer to:

 Basketane
 Dicyclopentadiene
 2,4-Dimethylstyrene
 2,5-Dimethylstyrene
 Tetralin